Basílio Teles (14 February 1856 – 10 March 1923) was a Portuguese author.

References

1856 births
1923 deaths
Portuguese male writers
People from Porto
19th-century Portuguese writers
19th-century male writers
University of Porto alumni